Brantley Lake State Park is a state park of New Mexico, United States, located approximately  north of Carlsbad. The park takes its name from Brantley Lake, a man-made reservoir created when Brantley Dam was built across the Pecos River in the 1980s. The lake is the southernmost lake in New Mexico, and it is popular for boating and fishing.

The lake is stocked with bass, white bass, walleye, catfish, bluegill, carp, and crappie, however officials have recently detected high levels of DDT in the fish and the State Parks Department is recommending that the fish not be eaten.

The park has 51 developed campsites with electricity, shower facilities, a playground, a visitor center, and other amenities.

References

External links
 Brantley Lake State Park

State parks of New Mexico
Parks in Eddy County, New Mexico
Protected areas established in 1989